Eudoxia (Eudoxía), Eudokia (Eudokía, anglicized as Eudocia) or Evdokia is a feminine given name, which originally meant "good fame or judgement" or "she whose fame or judgement is good" in Greek. The Slavic forms of the name are East Slavic: Evdokiya, Yevdokiya; South Slavic: Evdokija (Евдокија), Jevdokija (Јевдокија). It was mainly popular in late antiquity and during the Middle Ages, particularly in Eastern Europe. It continues to be in use today, usually in honor of various saints.

Eudoxia became the basis for the name Avdotia, which is a popular name for women in Russia.

Eudoxia, Eudokia and Eudocia
The names Eudoxia, Eudokia, and Eudocia are interchangeable in most cases for the Wikipedia search engine.

Saints
Eudoxia of Heliopolis (d. 120), early Christian saint and martyr
Virgin Martyr Eudoxia at Canopus in Egypt - died 311 with sisters Theodota and Theoctiste, mother Athanasia, Saints Cyrus and John
 Saint Eudocia: see below under Aelia Eudocia

Byzantine royals
 Aelia Eudoxia (c. 380–404), Byzantine empress, daughter of Flavius Bauto and wife of Emperor Arcadius
 Aelia Eudocia/Eudocia Augusta (c. 401–460), Saint Eudocia, Byzantine empress, wife of Theodosius II and daughter-in-law of Aelia Eudoxia
 Licinia Eudoxia (422–462), Western Roman empress, daughter of Theodosius II and Aelia Eudocia, wife of Emperors Valentinian III and Petronius Maximus
 Eudocia (daughter of Valentinian III)/Princess Eudocia (439–466/474?), daughter of Emperor Valentinian III and Licinia Eudoxia, wife of Vandal king Huneric
 Fabia Eudokia (c. 580–612), Byzantine empress, wife of the emperor Heraclius
 Eudoxia Epiphania (b. 611), daughter of emperor Heraclius and Fabia Eudokia
 Eudokia (wife of Justinian II) (7th century), Byzantine empress, wife of Justinian II
 Eudokia Ingerina (c. 840 – c. 882), Byzantine empress, wife of the 10th century Emperor Basil I
 Eudokia Baïana (died 901), Byzantine empress, wife of Leo VI the Wise
 Eudokia Makrembolitissa (1021–1096), Byzantine empress, wife of emperors Constantine X Doukas and Romanos IV Diogenes, putative author of a dictionary of history and mythology, often referred to as "Eudocia"
 Eudokia Komnene, daughter of John II Komnenos (1087–1143), wife of Theodore Vatatzes
 Eudoxia, Byzantine princess, niece and mistress of Andronikos I Komnenos (c. 1118–1185)
 Eudokia Angelina (d. 1211, or later), Byzantine princess, consort of Stefan the First-Crowned of Serbia
 Eudokia Palaiologina (1265-1302), daughter of Michael VIII Palaiologos and his wife Theodora

Non-Byzantine royals
 Eudoxia of Moscow or of Suzdal (Yevdokia) (d. 1407), Grand Duchess of the Grand Duchy of Moscow, wife of Dmitry Donskoy
 Eudoxia Lopukhina (1669–1731), first wife of Peter the Great
 Maria Eutokia Toaputeitou (d. 1869), queen of the Polynesian island of Mangareva, wife of Maputeoa, mother of Joseph Gregorio II

Fiction
 Eudoxia, a fictional character in the Anne Rice novel Blood and Gold
 Eudoxia, one of Italo Calvino's Invisible Cities
 Eudoxia, one of the colony worlds in The Expanse (Babylon’s Ashes)
 Eudoxia Vatatzes, mainspring character in Patrick White’s novel The Twyborn Affair

Evdokia
Evdokia, one variant of the Greek name, can stand for:
Evdokia Bobyleva (1919–2017), Russian teacher
Evdokia Kadi, Cypriot singer
Evdokia (film), a 1971 film starring Maria Vassiliou, George Koutouzis, Koula Agagiotou, and Christos Zorbas
Zeibekiko of Evdokia (film), the characteristic zeibekiko song

Slavic variants of the Greek name
Avdotya, Avdotia - Russian variant of the Greek name
Evdokija - Serbian variant of the Greek name
Evdokiya - Russian and Bulgarian variant of the Greek name

Places
Eudocia (Cappadocia), an ancient city of Cappadocia
Eudocia (Lycia), an ancient city of Lycia
Eudocias (Pamphylia), an ancient city of Pamphylia
Eudocia (Phrygia), an ancient city of Phrygia
Eudoxias, city and bishopric in Galatia, Anatolia
Eudocia, former name of Tokat, Anatolia

Ships
, British cargo ship

See also
Eudoxus and Eudoxius are male versions of the name.
Eudoxus (disambiguation)
Eudoxius can refer to (chronologically):
St. Eudoxius of Armenia, 2nd-century Roman soldier and Christian martyr from the time of Emperor Trajan
Holy Martyrs Eudoxius, Zeno, Macarius, and Companions (martyred 311–312); relevant here: St. Eudoxius of Melitene
St. Eudoxius of Sebaste, Christian martyr from the time of Emperor Licinius, martyred in 315 at Sebaste together with other Roman Christian soldiers - see Agapius, Atticus, Carterius, Styriacus, Tobias, Eudoxius, Nictopolion, and Companions
Eudoxius of Antioch (died 370), Arian bishop of Antioch and later of Constantinople
AD 442, Year of the Consulship of Dioscorus and Eudoxius
Eudoxius (jurist), professor and one of the 5th-century "Ecumenical Masters" at the Law school of Berytus
List of Byzantine emperors
List of Roman and Byzantine Empresses

Given names of Greek language origin
Greek feminine given names